Sumner's conjecture (also called Sumner's universal tournament conjecture) states that every orientation of every -vertex tree is a subgraph of every -vertex tournament. 
David Sumner, a graph theorist at the University of South Carolina, conjectured in 1971 that tournaments are universal graphs for polytrees. The conjecture was proven for all large  by Daniela Kühn, Richard Mycroft, and Deryk Osthus.

Examples
Let polytree  be a star , in which all edges are oriented outward from the central vertex to the leaves. Then,  cannot be embedded in the tournament formed from the vertices of a regular -gon by directing every edge clockwise around the polygon. Thus, if true, Sumner's conjecture would give the best possible size of a universal graph for polytrees.

Partial results
The following partial results on the conjecture have been proven.
There is a function  with asymptotic growth rate  with the property that every -vertex polytree can be embedded as a subgraph of every -vertex tournament. Additionally and more explicitly, .
There is a function  such that tournaments on  vertices are universal for polytrees with  leaves.
There is a function  such that every -vertex polytree with maximum degree at most  forms a subgraph of every tournament with  vertices.
Every "near-regular" tournament on  vertices contains every -vertex polytree.
Every orientation of an -vertex caterpillar tree with diameter at most four can be embedded as a subgraph of every -vertex tournament.
Every -vertex tournament contains as a subgraph every -vertex arborescence.

Related conjectures
 conjectured that every orientation of an -vertex path graph (with ) can be embedded as a subgraph into every -vertex tournament.

Havet and Thomassé in turn conjectured a strengthening of Sumner's conjecture, that every tournament on  vertices contains as a subgraph every polytree with at most  leaves.

Because complete graphs require a different color for each vertex, Sumner's conjecture would follow immediately from Burr's conjecture.

Notes

References
.
.
.
.
.
.
.
.
.
.
.
.
.
.

External links
Sumner's Universal Tournament Conjecture (1971), D. B. West, updated July 2008.

Conjectures
Unsolved problems in graph theory